Lupulella is a genus of canine found in Africa. This genus consists of only two extant species, the black-backed jackal (Lupulella mesomelas) and the side-striped jackal (Lupulella adusta).

Taxonomy
The two species had previously been considered members of the genus Canis. In 2017, a taxonomic review recommended that these two species be recognised as genus Lupulella. In response to this review, the American Society of Mammalogists recognised the new genus.

In 2019, a workshop hosted by the IUCN/SSC Canid Specialist Group recommends that because DNA evidence shows the side-striped jackal (Canis adustus) and black-backed jackal (Canis mesomelas) to form a monophyletic lineage that sits outside of the Canis/Cuon/Lycaon clade, that they should be placed in a distinct genus, Lupulella (Hilzheimer, 1906) with the names Lupulella adusta and Lupulella mesomelas.

Phylogeny
Cladogram based on genomic data:

References

External links

 
Mammal genera